Crypticus is a genus of beetles belonging to the family Tenebrionidae.

Species:
 Crypticus antoinei
 Crypticus castaneus

References

Tenebrionidae